The 1967 World Table Tennis Championships were held at the Johanneshovs Isstadion in Stockholm from April 11 to April 21, 1967.

During the Cultural Revolution, Chinese sports professionals were denounced as 'Sprouts of Revisionism' and were denied places at the 1967 World Table Tennis Championships and 1969 World Table Tennis Championships. Players such as Jung Kuo-tuan were persecuted and he committed suicide in 1968. Had China competed in those championships and not lost the impetus gained in the previous decade they would surely have continued to dominate the World Championships.

Medalists

Team

Individual

References

External links
ITTF Museum

 
World Table Tennis Championships
World Table Tennis Championships
World Table Tennis Championships
Table tennis competitions in Sweden
April 1967 sports events in Europe
1960s in Stockholm
International sports competitions in Stockholm